The 1993 European Cup was the 14th edition of the European Cup of athletics.

It was the first edition to use the term "Leagues" (Super League, First League, Second League). The Super League Finals were held in Rome, Italy.

Super League
Held on 26 and 27 June in Rome, Italy

Team standings

The dissolved Soviet Union was replaced by Russia and Ukraine which resulted in 9 teams competing. As a result, three teams had to be relegated to the first league.

Results summary

Men's events

Women's events

First League
First League was held on 12 and 13 June in Brussels, Belgium

Second League
The Second League was held on 12 and 13 June

Men

Held in Villach, Austria

Held in Copenhagen, Denmark

Held in Rotterdam, Netherlands

Women

Held in Villach, Austria

Held in Copenhagen, Denmark

Held in Rotterdam, Netherlands

References

External links
European Cup results (Men) from GBR Athletics
European Cup results (Women) from GBR Athletics

European Cup (athletics)
European Cup
1993 in European sport
1993 in Italian sport
International athletics competitions hosted by Italy